Dan Burt  is the Head Women's Basketball Coach at the Duquesne University.

Career
He has been a Division One Women's Basketball coach for 22 years with assistant coaching stops at West Virginia University (3 years), UNC Wilmington (3 years), and Bucknell (3 years) and Duquesne University (6 years).  Burt played collegiately at West Liberty State

Head coaching record

References

External links
Duquesne hires women's basketball coach Pittsburgh Post-Gazette
Duquesne names Burt as women's basketball head coach Pittsburgh Tribune-Review

1970 births
Living people
American men's basketball players
American women's basketball coaches
Basketball coaches from Pennsylvania
Basketball players from Pennsylvania
Bucknell Bison women's basketball coaches
Duquesne Dukes women's basketball coaches
People from Washington, Pennsylvania
Sportspeople from the Pittsburgh metropolitan area
UNC Wilmington Seahawks women's basketball coaches
West Liberty Hilltoppers men's basketball players
West Virginia Mountaineers women's basketball coaches